Cowboys and Herds in the Maremma is an oil on canvas painting by Giovanni Fattori, signed and dated 1893. It is now in the Museo civico Giovanni Fattori in Livorno, which also houses two preparatory drawings for the work. Another preparatory sketch is in the Uffizi.

Fattori also produced Cowboys and Flocks in Maremma (1894), Flock Herders (1894) and Head of a Cowboy on similar subjects - the third of these was exhibited in a Fattori retrospective exhibition in Florence in 1987. Cowboys was on the largest size of canvas available to him, which he only otherwise used for battle scenes and Market at San Godenzo. He exhibited it at the Venice Biennale in 1903, the Rome Biennale in 1921, the retrospective of Fattori's work in 1953, the Florence exhibition on the Macchiaioli in 1976 and the Il lavoro dell'uomo da Goya a Kandinskij at the Vatican (1991–1992).

References

1893 paintings
Paintings in Livorno
Paintings by Giovanni Fattori